Pézard is a French surname. Notable people with the surname include:

 Albert Pezard (1875–1927), French endocrinologist
 Maurice Pézard (1876–1923), French archaeologist and assyriologist 

French-language surnames